Jürgen Todenhöfer (born 12 November 1940) is a German author, journalist, politician, and executive.

Early life and education
Todenhöfer was born in Offenburg in what is now the current German state of Baden-Württemberg, and studied law at the universities of Munich, Paris, Bonn and Freiburg. He graduated as a doctor of law in 1969 and worked as a judge from 1972 on.

Politics
Todenhöfer became a member of the Christian Democratic Union of Germany (CDU) in 1970 which he left on 12 November 2020, his 80th birthday, to found a new political party   and was a member of the Bundestag from 13 December 1972 to 20 December 1990 (five election periods) where he represented Tübingen and was affiliated with the pejoratively named "Stahlhelm-Fraktion." He also acted as party spokesman for development policy and arms control. He was vice chairman of the executive board of German media company Hubert Burda Media until 2008.
He is considered to be a pacifist although he pointed out that he is not. He participates in the Bundestag election 2021 with his own party, Team Todenhöfer.

He is a Christian.

Journalism
In 1980 he visited Soviet-occupied Afghanistan and started to raise money for refugees. Todenhöfer is one of the most prominent German critics of the US-led wars against Afghanistan and against Iraq in 2001 and 2003, respectively.

He claims that during the war in Iraq the Bush administration was deceiving the public and that the US war in Iraq has killed several hundred thousand Iraqi civilians. He has visited Iraq several times and did original research for his book Why do you kill, Zaid?

Following the International Criminal Court's arrest warrant against the Sudanese dictator Omar al-Bashir, he sent an open letter to the Prosecutor General of the ICC, Luis Moreno-Ocampo. He asked for the reasons which led the prosecutor to indict the Sudanese dictator but not the US president George W. Bush or the British prime minister Tony Blair, seeing that neither Sudan nor the US have recognized the International Criminal Court.

In June 2019, he was shot in the back with a rubber bullet by an Israeli sniper in a protest.

First western journalist to visit ISIS

In the summer of 2014 Todenhӧfer sent a message on Facebook to more than 80 German ISIS soldiers asking whether he could visit the ISIS fighting cadre. His goal was to understand the motivations of ISIS. On 9 September, Abu Qatadah, a 31-year-old German and an important person in ISIS media, answered the message. They had Skype discussions for several months. Finally, Todenhӧfer received a document guaranteeing his safety. In October 2014, Todenhӧfer was the first western journalist to travel to ISIS-controlled territory. He was accompanied by his filmmaker son, Frederic.

Todenhöfer wrote that he stayed with an ISIS soldier who was armed with a Kalashnikov rifle. The soldier told him that he was sure to return home alive because ISIS wanted to be accepted as a state, so he had the guarantee of safety from their leadership. In other words, violation of the guarantee would mean violation of this state. Todenhӧfer spent most of his time in Mosul, Iraq but he could have visited ISIS-controlled cities in Syria such as Raqqa and Deir ez-Zor.

Interview with al Nusra commander
In 2016 Todenhöfer filmed an interview with an alleged Syrian rebel commander near Aleppo. The commander, said to be with the al-Qaeda affiliated group the Al-Nusra Front (later Jabhat Fateh al-Sham), claimed to have American support and said his group opposed humanitarian aid to civilians.  Whether the commander was truly a Nusra fighter was later questioned and the authenticity of the video disputed. Todenhöfer did not respond to questions about his interview.

Controversies

Alleged Falsification Accusations about Journalistic Works 
In 2016 the German newspaper "Der Spiegel" analyzed Todenhöfers story "Inside IS", in which he reports allegedly visiting the Islamic State and speaking to several of its members. Spiegel's article contained many hefty accusations, disputing most of Todenhöfer's claims. The article concluded Todenhöfer's work was more a "fictional novel than a factual documentary", and calling Todenhöfer a "Märchenonkel" (lying pope). Todenhöfer subsequently sued "Der Spiegel".

Cooperation with Xavier Naidoo 
In 2015 Todenhöfer recorded a song with the German songwriter Xavier Naidoo, who drifted far into the right spectrum. The song was a protest against the German support of the military intervention in Syria. In it, Muslims are called the "new Jews bearing the responsibility of the star of David". In general opinion Naidoo's and Todenhöfer's song was widely critized, citing their blunt antisemitism and relationship to Syria's dictator Assad. In fact, Todenhöfer has been found in close contact to Assad and his daugher, calling her "my little princess".

Major works 
 Wer weint schon um Abdul und Tanaya? (2003)
 Andy und Marwa. Zwei Kinder und der Krieg (2005)
 Warum tötest du, Zaid? (2008) Why do You Kill, Zaid?
 Why Do You Kill?: The Untold Story of the Iraqi Resistance (2008) 
 Teile Dein Glück (2010)
 Du sollst nicht töten: Mein Traum vom Frieden (2013)
 10 Tage im Islamischen Staat (2015)  Ten Days in the Islamic State

Bibliography
Notes

External links 
 Jürgen Todenhöfer's webpage
 Jürgen Todenhöfer on Facebook
 Facebook.Teile-dein-Glück
Jürgen Todenhöfer's book "Who cries for Abdul and Tanaya? – The Falsities in the Crusade against Terror" (in German)
 
 "Marwa's story: 10 years since the bomb fell", BBC article, 12 March 2013.

1940 births
Living people
People from Offenburg
People from the Republic of Baden
Members of the Bundestag for Baden-Württemberg
German political writers
German male non-fiction writers
German pacifists
Lutheran pacifists
Historians of the Islamic State of Iraq and the Levant
Historians of the Iraq War
War correspondents of the Iraq War
German war correspondents
Writers on the Middle East
Members of the Bundestag for the Christian Democratic Union of Germany
Jurists from Baden-Württemberg
20th-century German judges